The discography of British recording artist Cher Lloyd consists of two studio albums, ten singles, five featured singles, and eight promotional singles.

Lloyd rose to fame in 2010 when she participated in reality TV series The X Factor, to which she finished in fourth place. Shortly afterward, Lloyd was signed by Simon Cowell to Sony Records subsidiary Syco Music, releasing her debut single "Swagger Jagger" in June 2011. "Swagger Jagger" entered at number one on the UK Singles Chart and number two on the Irish Singles Chart. Her second single "With Ur Love" was released on 31 October, featuring Mike Posner, and reached number four in the UK, and number five in Ireland, preceding her debut album Sticks + Stones, which reached number four on the UK Albums Chart and number seven on the Irish Albums Chart. "Want U Back", featuring American rapper Astro, served as the album's third single and was released on 13 February 2012.

Studio albums

Singles

As lead artist

As featured artist

Promotional singles

Other charted songs

Music videos

Notes

References

Discographies of British artists
Pop music discographies